Ceryx flaviplagia is a moth of the subfamily Arctiinae. It was described by George Hampson in 1898. It is found in the Philippines.

References

Ceryx (moth)
Moths described in 1898